"Inheritance" is the 162nd episode of the American science fiction television series Star Trek: The Next Generation, the tenth episode of the seventh season.

Set in the 24th century, the series follows the adventures of the Starfleet crew of the Federation starship Enterprise-D. In this episode, as the Enterprise helps a planet to survive, Lieutenant Commander Data (Brent Spiner) must work with two local scientists from the planet. One scientist seems particularly interested in Data.

Plot 
The Enterprise arrives at Altrea IV, a planet with a core that is cooling and solidifying. Pran and Juliana Tainer, scientists from Altrea IV, inform the crew about the problem. Lieutenant Commanders Geordi La Forge (LeVar Burton) and Data suggest injecting plasma into the core to restore it to its molten state. After the other members of the briefing depart, Juliana reveals herself to be the former wife of Data's creator, Noonien Soong.

Data can only find one Juliana in his memory, a Juliana O'Donnell. She explains that after protests from her mother, she and Noonien decided to elope. A Klingon and a Carvalan Freighter captain served as marriage witnesses. She explains that his early memories were wiped and replaced with memories of the colonists of Omicron Theta. He was about to be reactivated when the Crystalline Entity attacked. Data conducts his own research into Juliana's story and finds evidence to circumstantially support her claims and decides to accept her as his mother while he learns more.

As they begin the plasma infusion, Juliana tells Data and La Forge a story about Data's trouble with learning to keep his clothes on. Data takes her to his quarters, where he plays his violin. She offers to play with him and uses a viola. Among his paintings, she sees one of his daughter, Lal. Juliana is overcome with emotion when she is told of Lal's demise. Juliana asks Data to be careful if he intends to create another child. She admits that she was against Data being created due to the problems with Lore and confesses that she forced Noonien to leave Data behind when the Crystalline Entity attacked, fearing he would awaken to become like Lore.

Data observes something about Juliana, and asks Beverly Crusher to examine her medical records when Commander William Riker calls. An emergency requires that Juliana and Data go down to effect repairs. They complete their task and return to the transport point, but find the pattern enhancers have fallen down a cliff. They must jump to safety. When Data jumps, he takes Juliana over the cliff with him. Data lands safely, but Juliana is knocked unconscious and her arm becomes detached from her torso. Data observes a network of circuitry and it becomes apparent that Juliana is an android.

In Juliana's positronic brain, La Forge finds a chip with a holographic interface. Data activates the chip in the holodeck and sees his father, Dr. Soong, who created the interactive holo-program to answer questions about the Juliana android. Soong explains that his wife once was a real human, but was mortally wounded as a result of the Crystalline Entity's attack. He created a new android and used synaptic scanning to place Juliana's memories into it. After the real Juliana died, Soong activated the android's body and she awoke believing she was human. She later chose to leave Soong and he let her go (after installing the chip), sadly admitting that the real Juliana would have left him too. Soong pleads with Data to let her have her humanity. Data remarks that he suspected Juliana was an android by three clues: she exactly matched his mathematical calculations; her random blinking eyes pattern match his own, and she exactly matched his viola playing.

Data returns to Sickbay and replaces the chip. When he closes Juliana's head, she awakens. He tells her that she fell from the cliff and broke her arm, but Dr. Crusher has repaired it, and everything is fine. As Juliana prepares to leave the ship, Data tells her "My father told me that he had only one great love in his life. And that he regretted never telling her how much he cared for her. I am certain he was referring to you."

Reception 
In 2020, Gamespot recommended this episode for background on the character of Data.

Releases 
"Inheritance" has been released as part of TNG Season 7 collections on DVD and Blu-Ray formats. Season seven of TNG, which contains this episode was released on Blu-ray disc in January 2015.

See also

 "Datalore" - the first season episode which introduces both Lore and the Crystalline Entity
 "The Offspring" - the third season episode where Data creates a daughter, Lal
 "Brothers" - the fourth season episode where Data actually meets his creator, Dr. Soong
 "Silicon Avatar" - the fifth season episode where Data meets a scientist whose son died on Omicron Theta, and his final encounter with the Crystalline Entity

References

External links
 

Star Trek: The Next Generation (season 7) episodes
1993 American television episodes
Television episode directed by Robert Scheerer